The original Long Eaton railway station was built in 1839 for the Midland Counties Railway.

History
Situated on Meadow Lane, it was the second station from Nottingham. After a few years the Midland Counties Railway joined the North Midland Railway and the Birmingham and Derby Junction Railway to form the Midland Railway. 

In 1847, a new station was opened in Long Eaton on Nottingham Road on the newly built Erewash Valley Line. This new station was known as Long Eaton, so the MCR station was renamed Long Eaton Junction. 

The MCR station was closed in 1862 when the junctions were realigned and Trent railway station was built.

Stationmasters
Mr. Tipper ca. 1844 
William Palmer ca. 1851 - 1862 (afterwards station master at Alfreton)

See also
Long Eaton railway station (1847-1863)
Long Eaton railway station (1863-1967)

References

Disused railway stations in Derbyshire
Station MCR
Railway stations in Great Britain opened in 1839
Former Midland Railway stations
Railway stations in Great Britain closed in 1862
1839 establishments in England
1862 disestablishments in England